University Park–Emory Highlands–Emory Estates is a historic district listed on the National Register of Historic Places in the Druid Hills CDP adjacent to Emory University near Atlanta, Georgia.

The University Park tract broke ground in 1916 and consists of 65 houses along Emory and Ridgewood Drives.

Emory Highlands was laid out in 1923 and consists of 58 lots along Burlington Road and Ridgewood Drive between University and
North Decatur Road.

Emory Estates was laid out in 1925 and consists of 73 lots on Emory Circle and Durand Drive. Houses here date from 1925 through 1943.

Architecture
Small, Craftsman-style bungalows and English Vernacular-style cottages are most common. There are also some larger, two-story Colonial Revival-style houses.

References
 Continuation Sheet, National Register of Historic Places - History and architecture of the district

Houses on the National Register of Historic Places in Georgia (U.S. state)
Geography of DeKalb County, Georgia
Druid Hills, Georgia
Bungalow architecture in Georgia (U.S. state)
Houses in DeKalb County, Georgia
Historic districts on the National Register of Historic Places in Georgia (U.S. state)
National Register of Historic Places in DeKalb County, Georgia